Bizarre Inc were an English techno group. Formed in 1989 as a duo between English DJs Dean Meredith and Mark "Aaron" Archer (not to be confused with the film producer of the same name), they later re-formed as a trio consisting of Meredith, Andrew Meecham, and Carl Turner in 1990.

Career
The group formed as Meredith and Archer linked to start an acid-house/techno project under 'Blue Chip Records'. A label owned by former Wigan Casino DJ Kev Roberts.

The first releases were (and still are) only available on 12'' vinyl: "It's Time to Get Funky" (BLUE C14R), later shortened to "Time to Get Funky" (BLUE C14RR); and the 6-track debut album Technological, both written and produced by Meredith and Archer.

By 1990, Archer left Meredith to work as producer and writer with different house and techno projects, a greater part of which were for Network Records. He was also known as DJ Nex for a long time; later on he released material under names such as Mr. Nex, O.P.D., Xen Mantra, and others (including Nexus 21 and Altern-8 with co-producer Chris Peat). Still in the same year, two other experienced DJs – Andrew Meecham and Carl Turner – joined Bizarre Inc, thus forming a new trio. The first 12'' they released together was "Bizarre Theme" / "X-Static" on the now-defunct record label, Vinyl Solution. This first track got a moderate acceptance, and their next single, "Such a Feeling", which sampled the Aurra club hit "Such a Feeling", peaked at number 13. The next single, "Playing with Knives", peaked at number 4; the song's vinyl (7-inch and 12-inch) releases were issued on a couple of different European labels.

On 19 October 1992, Bizarre Inc released the album Energique. shortly after the BPI Silver Certified "I'm Gonna Get You" single featuring Angie Brown was released on 21 September via Vinyl Solution on 12-inch vinyl. Bizarre Inc twice went to number one on the United States Hot Dance Club Play chart. The BPI Silver Certified "I'm Gonna Get You" spent two weeks at number one in January (also hitting number 47 on the Billboard Hot 100) and was followed by "Took My Love", which was number one for two weeks in late April. Angie Brown is featured as lead vocalist on both releases. A third song, "Love in Motion" (featuring Yvonne Yanney), peaked at number 4 on the U.S. dance chart in late 1993. Three of Bizarre Inc's hit singles appeared on Energique in 1992.

They also released a third album, the more commercial Surprise, in 1996.

Meecham and Meredith have continued releasing new music together under the name Chicken Lips. In the UK, their biggest singles remain "Playing with Knives" (number 4) and "I'm Gonna Get You" (number 3), the latter of which was a crossover dance-pop hit and was one of the biggest sellers of that year.

Discography

Studio albums

Singles

See also
List of artists who reached number one on the US Dance chart

References

English techno music groups
Hardcore techno music groups
Electronic dance music DJs
English DJs
English record producers
Musical groups established in 1989
Musical groups disestablished in 1996
Musical groups from Staffordshire
Remixers
Some Bizzare Records artists